Jargalyn Erdenetülkhüür (born 13 September 1978) is a Mongolian cross-country skier. He competed in the men's 15 kilometre classical event at the 2002 Winter Olympics.

References

External links
 

1978 births
Living people
Mongolian male cross-country skiers
Olympic cross-country skiers of Mongolia
Cross-country skiers at the 2002 Winter Olympics
Sportspeople from Ulaanbaatar
Cross-country skiers at the 1999 Asian Winter Games
Cross-country skiers at the 2003 Asian Winter Games
20th-century Mongolian people
21st-century Mongolian people